Rushmere Ward is a ward in the North East Area of Ipswich, Suffolk, England. It returns three councillors to Ipswich Borough Council.

It is designated Middle Layer Super Output Area Ipswich 004 by the Office of National Statistics. It is composed of 5 Lower Layer Super Output Areas.

Ward profile, 2008
Rushmere Ward is located on the north-eastern edge of Ipswich. In 2005 it had a population of about 8,000. The ward has a low proportion of 16-29 year olds and a high proportion of single person pensioner households.

Councillors
The following councillors were elected since the boundaries were changed in 2002. Names in brackets indicates that the councillor remained in office without re-election.

References

Wards of Ipswich